Shakhtyorsk Airport (Russian: Аэропорт Шахтёрск) (IATA: EKS, ICAO: UHSK) is an airport in Shakhtyorsk in the Uglegorsky District of the Sakhalin Oblast.

Airlines and destinations

References

Airports in Sakhalin Oblast